Silverville is an unincorporated community in Indian Creek Township, Lawrence County, Indiana.

History
A post office was established at Silverville in 1851, and remained in operation until it was discontinued in 1906. Silverville was platted on July 26, 1855.

Geography

References

Unincorporated communities in Lawrence County, Indiana
Unincorporated communities in Indiana